The BMW R51/3 was BMW's second post-World War II 500 cc motorcycle, following the briefly produced R51/2. It featured a flat-twin engine and exposed drive shaft. In 1951, the R51/3 succeeded and modernized the 1950 R51/2, which was essentially a pre-war design that was produced after the war.  The 600 cc R67, R67/2, and R67/3 series and the more sporting R68 model also followed the R51/2.

History
Following World War II, Germany was precluded from producing motorcycles of any sort by the Allies. When the ban was lifted, in 
Allied-controlled Western Germany, BMW had to start from scratch. There were no plans, blueprints, or schematic drawings. Company engineers had to use surviving pre-war motorcycles to create new plans. In 1948, it introduced the 250 cc R24, which was essentially a pre-war R23, complete with rigid rear end.

When larger machines were permitted, BMW introduced its R51/2 in 1950, a model that was in production for only one year and that was essentially a pre-war BMW produced after the war. The R51/3 was then introduced in 1951 for a production run of four years.

The 600 cc R67, sister model to the R51/3 and almost identical visually, was also introduced in 1951, but it went through two revisions. The more powerful R67/2 came out one year later and was replaced in 1955 by the R67/3, which was in production through the 1956 model year.

In 1952, BMW introduced the 600 cc R68, which produced  , had a compression ratio of 8.0:1.

Technical data

See also
 History of BMW motorcycles
 Motorcycle fork
 BMW R68
List of motorcycles of the 1950s

References

External links

R51 3
Motorcycles powered by flat engines
Shaft drive motorcycles
Motorcycles introduced in the 1950s